National Highway 648 (NH 648) is a  National Highway in India.

References

External links 

 NH 648 on OpenStreetMap

National highways in India